Wuzi of Han may refer to:
 Wuzi of Han (Spring and Autumn), the progenitor of the House of Han, and later State of Han
 Wuzi of Han (Warring States), a descendant of the above and also ruler of the State of Han